René Dupont (18 April 1896 – 22 March 1966) was a French weightlifter. He competed in the men's heavyweight event at the 1924 Summer Olympics.

References

External links
 

1896 births
1966 deaths
French male weightlifters
Olympic weightlifters of France
Weightlifters at the 1924 Summer Olympics
Place of birth missing
20th-century French people